is a passenger railway station located in Isogo-ku, Yokohama, Kanagawa Prefecture, Japan, operated by the East Japan Railway Company (JR East). The station is also a freight terminal on the Japan Freight Railway Company, as well as the terminus for the all-freight Honmoku Line of the Kanagawa Rinkai Railway.

Lines

Station layout 
The station consists of an island platform serving two tracks for normal passenger operations, and an additional five tracks for freight operations. The station has a "Midori no Madoguchi" staffed ticket office.

Platforms

History
Negishi Station was opened on  May 19, 1964, as a station on the Japan National Railways (JNR) for both passenger and freight services.  The Kanagawa Rinkai Railway's Honmoku Line, also for freight-only operations, began operations from Negishi on October 1, 1969. The station was absorbed into the JR East network upon the privatization of the Japan National Railways (JNR) in 1987.

Passenger statistics
In fiscal 2019, the station was used by an average of 21,998 passengers daily (boarding passengers only).

The passenger figures (boarding passengers only) for previous years are as shown below.

Surrounding area
 ENEOS Negishi Refinery
 Kanagawa Prefectural Hygiene Nursing College
 Yokohama Municipal Negishi Junior High School
 Yokohama Municipal Negishi Elementary School

See also
 List of railway stations in Japan

References

External links

 

Railway stations in Kanagawa Prefecture
Railway stations in Japan opened in 1964
Keihin-Tōhoku Line
Negishi Line
Railway stations in Yokohama
Stations of Japan Freight Railway Company